In the geologic timescale, the Ludfordian is the upper of two chronostratigraphic stages within the Ludlow Series. Its age is the late Silurian Period, and within both the Palaeozoic Era and Phanerozoic Eon. The rocks assigned to the Ludfordian date to between 425.6 ± 0.9 Ma and 423.0 ± 2.3 Ma (million years ago). The Ludfordian Stage succeeds the Gorstian Stage and precedes the Pridoli Epoch. It is named for the village of Ludford in Shropshire, England. The GSSP for the Ludfordian is represented as a thin shale seam, coincident with the base of the Leintwardine Formation, overlying the Bringewood Formation in England.

Paleoclimate 
It is one of the series of fast sea-level and excursions in oxygen isotope ratios that signal fast switches between warm and cold climate states, characteristic of the Silurian climatic instability. The Lau Event occurred during an extended period of elevated seawater saturation state, explained by reservoirs of the planet's fresh water being locked up in massive polar ice caps. The sudden reappearance in normally saline marine environments of stromatolites and a mass occurrence of oncoids during the event suggested that minor extinction events like the Lau Event also resulted in periods of reduced grazing pressures on surviving "disaster biota", which can be compared to the aftermath of the more catastrophic end-Ordovician and end-Permian mass extinctions.

References 

 
Ludlow epoch
Silurian geochronology